Michaël Llodra and Diego Nargiso were the defending champions but only Llodra competed that year with Eyal Ran.

Llodra and Ran lost in the quarterfinals to Feliciano López and Francisco Roig.

Donald Johnson and Jared Palmer won in the final 7–5, 6–3 against López and Roig.

Seeds
Champion seeds are indicated in bold text while text in italics indicates the round in which those seeds were eliminated.

  Donald Johnson /  Jared Palmer (champions)
  Mark Knowles /  Jeff Tarango (semifinals)
  Michael Hill /  Scott Humphries (first round)
  Wayne Black /  Kevin Ullyett (semifinals)

Draw

External links
 2001 Majorca Open Doubles draw

Doubles